Jangy-Aryk may refer to the following places in Kyrgyzstan:

Jangy-Aryk, Nooken, a village in Nooken District, Jalal-Abad Region
Jangy-Aryk, Aravan, a village in Aravan District, Osh Region
Jangy-Aryk, Kara-Suu, a village in Kara-Suu District, Osh Region